The women's 75 kg freestyle wrestling competition at the 2014 Commonwealth Games in Glasgow, Scotland was held on 29 July at the Scottish Exhibition and Conference Centre.

Results
As there were less than 6 competitors entered in this event, the competition was contested as a Nordic round with each athlete playing every other athlete. The medallists were determined by the standings after the completion of the Nordic round.

References

Wrestling at the 2014 Commonwealth Games
Com